Posyolok imeni Karla Marksa is a rural locality (a settlement) and the administrative center of Bryzgalovskoye Rural Settlement, Kameshkovsky District, Vladimir Oblast, Russia. The population was 1,434 as of 2010. There are 16 streets.

Geography 
The settlement is located on the Naromsha River, 12 km northeast of Kameshkovo (the district's administrative centre) by road. Bryzgalovo is the nearest rural locality.

References 

Rural localities in Kameshkovsky District